Sàbat Hill (‘Halm Sàbat’ \'h&lm 'sa-bat\) is the ice-free hill rising to 151 m in Dospey Heights on the Ray Promontory of Byers Peninsula, Livingston Island in the South Shetland Islands, Antarctica. Surmounting Richards Cove to the west-northwest and Barclay Bay to the east.

The feature is part of the Antarctic Specially Protected Area ASPA 126 Byers Peninsula, situated in one of its restricted zones.

The hill is named after Francesc Sàbat from Juan Carlos I Base who, together with Jorge Enrique, made the first ascent of the island's summit Mount Friesland (1700 m) on 30 December 1991.

Location
Spanish mapping in 1992, and Bulgarian in 2010.

Maps
 Península Byers, Isla Livingston. Mapa topográfico a escala 1:25000. Madrid: Servicio Geográfico del Ejército, 1992.
 L.L. Ivanov et al. Antarctica: Livingston Island and Greenwich Island, South Shetland Islands. Scale 1:100000 topographic map. Sofia: Antarctic Place-names Commission of Bulgaria, 2005.
 L.L. Ivanov. Antarctica: Livingston Island and Greenwich, Robert, Snow and Smith Islands. Scale 1:120000 topographic map.  Troyan: Manfred Wörner Foundation, 2009.  
 L.L. Ivanov. Antarctica: Livingston Island and Smith Island. Scale 1:100000 topographic map. Manfred Wörner Foundation, 2017.

Notes

References
 Bulgarian Antarctic Gazetteer. Antarctic Place-names Commission. (details in Bulgarian, basic data in English)
 Sàbat Hill. SCAR Composite Gazetteer of Antarctica

External links
 Sàbat Hill. Copernix satellite image

Hills of Livingston Island
Bulgaria and the Antarctic
Spain and the Antarctic